Garscadden/Scotstounhill (Ward 13) is one of the 23 wards of Glasgow City Council. Since its creation in 2007 it has retained the same boundaries and returned four council members, using the single transferable vote system.

Boundaries
Located in the north-west of Glasgow, the ward is immediately north of the River Clyde which is its southern boundary. It is directly adjacent to the town of Clydebank (West Dunbartonshire) to the west. As its name suggests, it includes the neighbourhoods of Garscadden and Scotstounhill, as well as Yoker, Scotstoun and part of Knightswood (streets to the west of Great Western Road and Knightswood Road).

The ethnic makeup of the Garscadden/Scotstounhill ward using the 2011 census population statistics was:

89.8% White Scottish / British / Irish / Other
4.9% Asian (mainly Pakistani)
4.2% Black (mainly African)
1.2% Mixed / Other Ethnic Group

Councillors

Election Results

2022 Election
2022 Glasgow City Council election

2017 Election
2017 Glasgow City Council election

2012 Election
2012 Glasgow City Council election

2016 by-election
On 25 July 2016, Labour councillor John Kelly died as a result of Motor Neuron Disease. A by-election was held on 6 October 2016 and was won by the SNP's Chris Cunningham.

2007 Election
2007 Glasgow City Council election

See also
Wards of Glasgow

References

External links
Listed Buildings in Garscadden/Scotstounhill Ward, Glasgow City at British Listed Buildings

Wards of Glasgow